The 2004–05 Atlanta Thrashers season was the sixth season for the National Hockey League franchise that was established on June 25, 1997.

No games were played during the 2004–05 NHL season due to the lock-out of the NHL players by the league, however teams business did occur, including the Thrashers' participation in the 2004 NHL Entry Draft that was held on June 26 in Raleigh, North Carolina.

Schedule
The Thrashers preseason and regular season schedules were announced on July 14, 2004.

|-
| 1 || September 26 || Tampa Bay Lightning
|-
| 2 || September 27 || @ Dallas Stars
|-
| 3 || September 29 || Carolina Hurricanes
|-
| 4 || October 3 || @ Carolina Hurricanes
|-
| 5 || October 5 || @ Tampa Bay Lightning
|-
| 6 || October 8 || Nashville Predators
|-
| 7 || October 9 || @ Nashville Predators
|-

|-
| 1 || October 14 || @ Carolina Hurricanes
|-
| 2 || October 16 || Washington Capitals
|-
| 3 || October 19 || @ Washington Capitals
|-
| 4 || October 21 || Buffalo Sabres
|-
| 5 || October 23 || @ New York Rangers
|-
| 6 || October 27 || @ Florida Panthers
|-
| 7 || October 29 || Detroit Red Wings
|-
| 8 || October 30 || @ Montreal Canadiens
|-
| 9 || November 3 || @ Anaheim Mighty Ducks
|-
| 10 || November 4 || @ Los Angeles Kings
|-
| 11 || November 6 || @ San Jose Sharks
|-
| 12 || November 8 || New Jersey Devils
|-
| 13 || November 10 || Tampa Bay Lightning
|-
| 14 || November 12 || @ Carolina Hurricanes
|-
| 15 || November 13 || @ Tampa Bay Lightning
|-
| 16 || November 17 || New York Rangers
|-
| 17 || November 19 || New York Islanders
|-
| 18 || November 20 || @ Boston Bruins
|-
| 19 || November 23 || Vancouver Canucks
|-
| 20 || November 26 || @ Philadelphia Flyers
|-
| 21 || November 27 || New Jersey Devils
|-
| 22 || December 1 || @ Colorado Avalanche
|-
| 23 || December 2 || @ Phoenix Coyotes
|-
| 24 || December 4 || @ Nashville Predators
|-
| 25 || December 7 || Tampa Bay Lightning
|-
| 26 || December 10 || Ottawa Senators
|-
| 27 || December 11 || @ Washington Capitals
|-
| 28 || December 15 || Carolina Hurricanes
|-
| 29 || December 16 || @ Toronto Maple Leafs
|-
| 30 || December 18 || @ Carolina Hurricanes
|-
| 31 || December 21 || New York Rangers
|-
| 32 || December 27 || Carolina Hurricanes
|-
| 33 || December 29 || Columbus Blue Jackets
|-
| 34 || December 31 || Washington Capitals
|-
| 35 || January 1 || @ Ottawa Senators
|-
| 36 || January 4 || @ New Jersey Devils
|-
| 37 || January 6 || Toronto Maple Leafs
|-
| 38 || January 8 || Washington Capitals
|-
| 39 || January 11 || @ Buffalo Sabres
|-
| 40 || January 12 || Nashville Predators
|-
| 41 || January 14 || Minnesota Wild
|-
| 42 || January 17 || @ Florida Panthers
|-
| 43 || January 19 || Pittsburgh Penguins
|-
| 44 || January 21 || Buffalo Sabres
|-
| 45 || January 23 || Dallas Stars
|-
| 46 || January 24 || @ Montreal Canadiens
|-
| 47 || January 27 || @ New York Rangers
|-
| 48 || January 29 || @ Philadelphia Flyers
|-
| 49 || January 30 || @ Washington Capitals
|-
| 50 || February 2 || Carolina Hurricanes
|-
| 51 || February 4 || Florida Panthers
|-
| 52 || February 5 || @ Tampa Bay Lightning
|-
| 53 || February 8 || Boston Bruins
|-
| 54 || February 10 || @ Minnesota Wild
|-
| 55 || February 15 || @ New York Islanders
|-
| 56 || February 16 || @ Chicago Blackhawks
|-
| 57 || February 19 || @ Pittsburgh Penguins
|-
| 58 || February 20 || @ Buffalo Sabres
|-
| 59 || February 24 || @ Ottawa Senators
|-
| 60 || February 26 || @ Toronto Maple Leafs
|-
| 61 || March 1 || @ Pittsburgh Penguins
|-
| 62 || March 2 || Philadelphia Flyers
|-
| 63 || March 4 || Florida Panthers
|-
| 64 || March 6 || Calgary Flames
|-
| 65 || March 7 || @ New York Islanders
|-
| 66 || March 9 || Ottawa Senators
|-
| 67 || March 11 || Colorado Avalanche
|-
| 68 || March 13 || Edmonton Oilers
|-
| 69 || March 15 || Boston Bruins
|-
| 70 || March 17 || @ New Jersey Devils
|-
| 71 || March 19 || Pittsburgh Penguins
|-
| 72 || March 21 || @ Florida Panthers
|-
| 73 || March 23 || Montreal Canadiens
|-
| 74 || March 25 || Toronto Maple Leafs
|-
| 75 || March 26 || @ St. Louis Blues
|-
| 76 || March 28 || Florida Panthers
|-
| 77 || March 31 || Philadelphia Flyers
|-
| 78 || April 2 || New York Islanders
|-
| 79 || April 4 || @ Boston Bruins
|-
| 80 || April 6 || Montreal Canadiens
|-
| 81 || April 8 || @ Tampa Bay Lightning
|-
| 82 || April 10 || Tampa Bay Lightning
|-

Transactions
The Thrashers were involved in the following transactions from June 8, 2004, the day after the deciding game of the 2004 Stanley Cup Finals, through February 16, 2005, the day the  season was officially canceled.

Trades

Players acquired

Players lost

Signings

Draft picks
Atlanta's picks at the 2004 NHL Entry Draft, which was held at the RBC Center in Raleigh, North Carolina on June 26–27, 2004.

Notes

References

Atlanta Thrashers seasons
Atlanta
Atlanta
Atlanta Thrashers
Atlanta Thrashers